Gerald Emmett Cardinal Carter  (1912–2003) was a Canadian prelate of the Roman Catholic Church. He served as Archbishop of Toronto from 1978 to 1990, and was elevated to the cardinalate in 1979.

Biography

Youth and ordination
The youngest of eight children, Emmett Carter was born on March 1, 1912, in Montreal, Quebec, to an Irish Catholic family. His father was a typesetter for The Montreal Star, his brother, Alexander, would become Bishop of Sault-Sainte-Marie, and two of his sisters would become nuns.

Carter attended the Collège de Montréal before studying at the Grand Seminary and the Université de Montréal, where he obtained his Licentiate in Theology in 1936. He was ordained to the priesthood by the Auxiliary Bishop of Montreal Alphonse-Emmanuel Deschamps on May 22, 1937.

Parish work
Carter then did pastoral work in the Archdiocese of Montreal until 1939, when he became the first director of the English section of Jacques-Cartier Normal school.

During his tenure as chaplain to the Catholic students at McGill University from 1942 to 1956, where he played a key role in establishing the Newman Centre of McGill University, he was also named director of the English section of Catholic Action (1944) and president of the Thomas More Institute (1946), and earned his doctorate in theology in 1947.

Archbishop of Toronto
He was Bishop of London, Ontario, from 1964 to 1978, when he was appointed Archbishop of Toronto. He retired in 1990 and was succeeded by Aloysius Ambrozic.

In 1976, he received an honorary doctorate from Concordia University. In 1982 he was made a Companion of the Order of Canada. The library at King's University College at the University of Western Ontario in London is named after him, as are Cardinal Carter Catholic High School in Aurora, Ontario, Cardinal Carter Academy for the Arts in Toronto, Ontario and Cardinal Carter Catholic Secondary School in Leamington, Ontario.

An important figure in Montreal's education system, founding St. Joseph's Teachers College for English-speaking Catholics, Cardinal Carter was a member of the Montreal Catholic School Commission for 15 years, and active at McGill University's Newman Club and the St. Thomas More Institute.

Pastoral programs
In Toronto, Carter was responsible for expanding the Archdiocese's pastoral programs, Catholic education and social services as well as implementing the reforms of Vatican II. He was involved with the opening of Covenant House for street youth and worked with the Province of Ontario to provide affordable housing to the elderly and disabled.

Cardinal Carter died in Toronto on April 6, 2003, and is buried at the Bishops' Mausoleum at Holy Cross Cemetery north of Toronto.

References

Bibliography
 

1912 births
2003 deaths
20th-century Roman Catholic archbishops in Canada
Participants in the Second Vatican Council
Roman Catholic archbishops of Toronto
Canadian cardinals
Companions of the Order of Canada
Clergy from Montreal
Cardinals created by Pope John Paul II
Roman Catholic bishops of London, Ontario